A haptic suit (also known as VR suit, tactile suit, gaming suit or haptic vest) is a wearable device that provides haptic feedback to the body.

History

Aura Interactor (1994)
In 1994 Aura Systems launched the Interactor Vest, conceived by Aura's VP of Audio and Video Technologies, Larry Shultz to feel sound from video games and TV shows.  The Interactor was a wearable force-feedback device that monitors an audio signal and uses Aura's patented electromagnetic actuator technology to convert bass sound waves into vibrations that can represent such actions as a punch or kick. The Interactor vest plugs into the audio output of a stereo, TV, or VCR and the user is provided with controls that allow for adjusting of the intensity of vibration and filtering out of high frequency sounds. The Interactor Vest is worn over the upper torso and the audio signal is reproduced through a speaker embedded in the vest. Sales numbers are unclear, but have numbers as low as 5000 of its Interactor Vest sold in Toys R Us and other electronics stores. Aura later began shipping the Interactor Cushion, a device which operates like the Vest but instead of being worn, it's placed against a seat back and the user must lean against it. Both the Vest and the Cushion were launched with a price tag of $99.

HugShirt (2002)
In January 2002, Francesca Rosella and Ryan Genz, then researchers at the Interaction Design Institute Ivrea in Italy, designed the HugShirt. The Hugshirt is a wearable haptic telecommunication device that allows a wearer to send the feeling of a hug to a distant loved one. HugShirts feature touch sensors and haptic actuators that work together to capture and recreate touch over distance. Sensor areas placed on the garment capture the touch of the wearer, the data is transferred to their mobile device where the Hug App creates a Hug message that is delivered to the receiving wearer of a second HugShirt in another location across the world. Actuators in the receiving HugShirt recreate the touch that was created by the first wearer. The HugShirt was awarded first prize at the Cyberat Bilbao Festival, and subsequently awarded by Time magazine as one of the best inventions of 2006.

SoundShirt (2016) 
The SoundShirt is a shirt that allows deaf and hearing audience members to experience music and AR enhanced by touch (haptic) sensations. The SoundShirt was used for its first performance by the Junge Symphoniker Orchestra in Hamburg, Germany. During a live or virtual performance the shirt maps different musical sounds to haptic sensations on different parts of the body, allowing media to be felt physically. The SoundShirt features 30 haptic multi-force actuators embedded into a garment. The SoundShirt is the winner of the 2019 UNESCO NETEXPLO Innovation award, and the Audience of the Future INNOVATE UK Innovation Grant.

bHaptics TactSuit (2017) 
 released three products which are a vest based on 40 haptic points, a haptic mask, and a haptic arm band with 20 haptic points.

Teslasuit 
The Teslasuit is a full body haptic suit with motion capture and biometric sensors. Its haptic feedback system uses electrical muscle stimulation  (EMS) and transcutaneous electrical nerve stimulation (TENS) to simulate feelings and sensations.

The use of biometric sensors has proposed uses in medicine, and specifically rehabilitation psychology.

According to ABC News, Teslasuit is so far too expensive to go mainstream.

See also 

Ready Player One

References

Video game accessories
Haptic technology
Motion capture
Virtual reality accessories